Sweden competed at the 1992 Winter Paralympics in Tignes/Albertville, France. 9 competitors from Sweden won 4 medals including 1 gold, 1 silver and 2 bronze and finished joint 12th in the medal table with Australia.

See also 
 Sweden at the Paralympics
 Sweden at the 1992 Winter Olympics

References 

1992
1992 in Swedish sport
Nations at the 1992 Winter Paralympics